The Sumapaz River is a major tributary of the Magdalena River in Colombia. It forms the natural boundary between the departments of Cundinamarca and Tolima.

Course 

The Sumapaz River flows through the Magdalena Valley montane forests ecoregion in its upper reaches. The Sumapaz River flows through the department of Cundinamarca. It takes its name from its place of birth in the Sumapaz Páramo, the largest páramo in the world, in the rural zone of Bogotá. It is one of the main tributaries of the upper course of the Magdalena River

The lower reaches of the Fusagasugá River become the Sumapaz after the confluence of the Chocho and Cuja. The river and its tributaries, the Gobernador, Bejucal, San Juan, Negro, Guavio, Batán, Juan Viejo, Corrales, Bosque, Colorado, Barroblanco, Subia or Chocho, Panches and Pagüey all originate in the Sumapaz and San Fortunato páramos, apart from the Pagüey. The Fusagasugá valley is known for its pleasant climate and the surrounding hills. There was a  Fusagasugá Lagoon, which probably drained through the Melgar Valley. The river crosses the municipalities of Cabrera, Venecia, Pandi, Icononzo, Nilo, Melgar and Ricaurte. It forms the natural boundary between the departments of Tolima and Cundinamarca.

Physical and natural aspects 
The Sumapaz River can be divided into three sections: source, middle and lower valley. The source is in the Sumapaz Páramo, the world's largest páramo, and one of the most important sources of water, supplying the southern part of the Cundinamarca and important towns in the Tolima department.

Tourism 
The municipalities of Pandi, Melgar and Ricaurte are in the lower valley. These hold vacation spots for the people of the capital of Colombia, Bogotá, drawn by the warm climate and important tourist sites and hotels. In recent years, adventure sports like river rafting have become popular.

The Icononzo natural bridge is an important natural attraction, a geological formation of great beauty and complexity that was once visited by the German naturalist Alexander von Humboldt and that was once considered one of the hundred natural wonders of the world.

Future hydroelectric project
Since 2010, the power generation company Emgesa, a subsidiary of the Italian company Enel, has been conducting pre-feasibility and feasibility studies for construction of eight small hydroelectric power plants along the  stretch of the Sumapaz between the mouth of the San Juan River and the Las Lajas gorge, in the municipalities of Cabrera, Venice and Pandi in the department of Cundinamarca, and the municipality of Icononzo in Tolima.

See also 

 List of rivers of Colombia

References

Bibliography 

 
 
 
 
 
   

Rivers of Colombia
Magdalena River
Geography of Cundinamarca Department
Geography of Tolima Department
Geography of Bogotá